Derek O'Brien may refer to:
Derek O'Brien (drummer) (born 1963), American drummer for punk bands Social Distortion, D.I. and The Adolescents
Derek O'Brien (footballer, born 1957), Irish player for Boston Utd, Bohemians, Dundalk, Shamrock Rovers, Athlone Town, Longford Town & Home Farm
Derek O'Brien (footballer, born 1979), Irish footballer
Derek O'Brien (politician) (born 1961), Indian politician, author, television personality, public speaker and quiz show host

See also
Derrick O'Brien (1975–2006), executed convicted murderer